The 2010 Ukrainian Amateur Cup was the fifteenth annual season of Ukraine's football knockout competition for amateur football teams. The competition started on 11 August 2010 and concluded on 31 October 2010.

Competition schedule

First qualification round

Second qualification round

Quarterfinals (1/4)

Semifinals (1/2)

Final

See also
 2010 Ukrainian Football Amateur League
 2010–11 Ukrainian Cup

External links
 2010 Ukrainian Amateur Cup at the Footpass (Football Federation of Ukraine)

Ukrainian Amateur Cup
Ukrainian Amateur Cup
Amateur Cup
Amateur Cup